Camanşəir (also, Camaşayır, Dzhamanshair, and Dzhama-Shair) is a village and municipality in the Lerik Rayon of Azerbaijan.  It has a population of 275.

References 

Populated places in Lerik District